Route 433, also known as Englee Highway, is a  north–south highway on the Great Northern Peninsula of Newfoundland in the Canadian province of Newfoundland and Labrador. It connects the towns of Englee, Bide Arm, Roddickton, as well as Conche via Route 434 (Conche Road), with Route 432 (Main Brook Highway) and Main Brook.

Route description

Route 433 begins in downtown Englee and winds its way northward through neighbourhoods to leave town and travel along the cliffs overlooking the coastline for several kilometres. It now enters the combined municipality of Roddickton-Bide Arm and passes through Bide Arm before leaving the coastline and passing through wooded areas. The highway now winds its way through Roddickton, where it has an intersection with Route 434, before leaving town and Roddickton-Bide Arm to pass through rural areas for several kilometres before coming to an end at an intersection with Route 432.

Major intersections

References

433